Christ Light is a statue of Jesus Christ in the Brazilian seaside resort Balneário Camboriú.

Inspired in the world-famous Christ the Redeemer statue of Rio de Janeiro, it is a little smaller (33 m high) than the latter, and it portrays Jesus with a "broad-brimmed hat" like circle on his left shoulder, symbolizing the Sun, which houses a spotlight that shines out to the entire city.  The Cristo Luz is lit at night, also having colorful lights in its body that changes periodically.

References

Balneário Camboriú
Christianity in Brazil
Colossal statues of Jesus
Concrete sculptures in Brazil
Monuments and memorials in Brazil
Mountain monuments and memorials
Outdoor sculptures in Brazil
Buildings and structures in Santa Catarina (state)